Jacob Misiorowski (born April 3, 2002) is an American baseball pitcher in the Milwaukee Brewers organization.

Amateur career
Misiorowski grew up in Grain Valley, Missouri and attended Grain Valley High School. As a junior, he posted 9-2 record with a 1.48 ERA and was named All-State. Misiorowski's senior season was canceled due to COVID-19. Misiorowski initially committed to play college baseball at Oklahoma State, but later decided to enroll at Crowder College.

Misiorowski appeared in two games as a freshman at Crowder before redshirting the season. He committed to transfer to Louisiana State for his final three years of collegiate eligibility during the season. Misiorowski made 15 starts during his redshirt season and was named a second team NJCAA All-American after going 10-0 with a 2.72 ERA and 136 strikeouts in 76 innings pitched. Following the end of the season, Misiorowski participated in the Major League Baseball Combine and recorded the eight fastest pitches and averaged 99.8 miles per hour on his fastball.

Professional career
The Milwaukee Brewers selected Misiorowski 63rd overall in the 2022 Major League Baseball draft. He signed with the Brewers on July 27, 2022, for an over-slot signing bonus of $2.35 million.

References

External links

Crowder Roughriders bio

Living people
2002 births
Baseball players from Missouri
Baseball pitchers
Crowder Roughriders baseball players